The 2019 Cork Senior Hurling Championship was the 131st staging of the Cork Senior Hurling Championship since its establishment by the Cork County Board in 1887. The draw for the 2019 opening round fixtures took place on 15 January 2019. The championship began on 26 March 2019 and ended on 20 October 2019.

The final was played at Páirc Uí Rinn in Cork, between defending champions Imokilly and Glen Rovers, in what was their first meeting in a final in 70 years. Original venue, Páirc Uí Chaoimh, was deemed unplayable due to an unsatisfactory playing surface. Imokilly won the match by 2-17 to 1-16 to claim their sixth championship title overall and a first three-in-a-row of titles since St. Finbarr's in 1982.

Imokilly's Declan Dalton was the championship's top scorer with 3-55.

Team changes

To Championship

Promoted from the Cork Premier Intermediate Hurling Championship
 Charleville

Results

Divisional/colleges section

Preliminary round

Round 1

Round 2

Round 3

Quarter-finals

Semi-finals

Final

Championship statistics

Scoring

Top scorers overall

Top scorers in a single game

Miscellaneous

 Charleville return back to the senior grade for the first time since 1952.
 St. Finbarr's qualified for the semi-finals of the championship for the first time since 2009.
 On 21 September 2019, Patrick Horgan became the first player to score more than 500 points in the history of the championship.
 Imokilly became the first team since St. Finbarr's in 1982 to win three successive championships.

References

External links

 Cork GAA website

Cork Senior Hurling Championship
Cork